Cek (also, Jek, Dzheg and Dzhek) is a village in the Quba Rayon of Azerbaijan.  The village forms part of the municipality of Əlik. They live, primarily, in the region around Mount Shahdag in Quba Rayon in northeastern Azerbaidzhan.

Population
In 1886 their population was estimated at 7,767.

In 1926 their population was estimated at 607. Although only 607 individuals claimed Dzhek ethnicity, 4,348 listed Dzhek as their native language. These were probably Dzheks who listed themselves as Azerbaidzhans speaking Dzhek as their native language.

See also 
Jek people
Jek language

References

Sources 

 Cek, Azerbaijan
 Tərxan Paşazadə, "Dünyanın nadir etnik qrupu - Azərbaycan cekliləri", Azərbaycan qəzeti

Gallery 

 
Populated places in Quba District (Azerbaijan)